GEM Impact is an audio production studio founded by game composer and saxophonist Norihiko Hibino in 2005.  It is located in Tokyo, Japan, and employs a number of composers, producers, and artists.  Hibino's fluency in English has allowed him to take the GEM Impact brand to a worldwide platform, which is the basis for the studio's motto: "From Japan to worldwide."

The studio employs a number of composers, including Norihiko Hibino himself, Takahiro Izutani, Yoshitaka Suzuki, and Takahide Ayuzawa.  They have often made use of the talents of artist Uetake MacARTHUR for their graphical needs.

While Norihiko Hibino is well known for his contributions to the Metal Gear Solid series, many were left wondering what role GEM Impact had on the score for Metal Gear Solid 4: Guns of the Patriots, as their contributions were not publicized.  Hibino later revealed via an interview with Original Sound Version that GEM Impact in fact provided 90 minutes of music for the cinematic sequences in the game.

GEM Impact operates alongside GEM Factory, an in-house record label that has released two albums including The Outer Rim and the Ninja Blade Original Soundtrack.  Vanilla Mood, a night club in Japan, was also operated under GEM Impact, but closed at the end of 2008.

On September 2, 2008, FromSoftware announced the ninja action title, Ninja Blade, and named Norihiko Hibino and GEM Impact as the composers for the title.  The team has already completed the music for the title, totaling close to three hours of original music.  Hibino noted in a preview article at Original Sound Version that he believes this project represents the studio's greatest achievement to date, and it is a landmark for the studio. On February 10, 2009, it was announced that the group would work alongside PlatinumGames sound director Masami Ueda and composer Hiroshi Yamaguchi on the company's action title Bayonetta.

Staff
Norihiko Hibino (CEO, Composer, Producer, Saxophonist)
Takahiro Izutani  (Composer)
Yoshitaka Suzuki (Composer)
Takahide Ayuzawa (Composer)

Credits
2011
Bandai Namco "Go Vacation" (Wii, worldwide) – music, rec coordination, US main theme
Konami "Otomedius Excellent" (Xbox 360) - music, music arrangement

2009
PlatinumGames "Bayonetta" (PS3/Xbox 360, worldwide) - music

2008
Sammy "Unannounced Title" (Arcade, Japan) – music
FromSoftware "Ninja Blade" (Xbox 360, worldwide) – music, main theme, ending theme
Konami "Metal Gear Solid 4: Guns of the Patriots" (PS3, worldwide) – cinematic music
Atlus "Etrian Odyssey II SUPER ARRANGE VERSION" (CD, Japan) – music arrangement, production
Grasshopper Manufacture "No More Heroes" (Wii, worldwide) – main theme remix
The Outer Rim "The Outer Rim" (CD, worldwide) – production (via GEM Factory)
Capcom "1942" (Xbox Live Arcade, USA) – music
Konami "Metal Gear Solid 2: Sons of Liberty Bande Dessinee" (DVD, worldwide) – music
Konami "Beatmania 11DX 14 GOLD" (PS2, worldwide) – music
Bandai Namco "The Idolmaster Fami-Song 8-bit" (CD, Japan) – lyrics, music
Gonzo "Blassreiter" (anime, worldwide) – music
Tochigi TV "The Sun" (TV, Japan) – music, main theme

2007
Heiwa "Unannounced Title" (Arcade, Japan) – music, recording coordination
Konami "Metal Gear Solid: Portable Ops Plus" (PSP, worldwide) – music
Capcom "Commando 3" (Xbox Live Arcade, USA) – music
Atlus "Etrian Odyssey SUPER ARRANGE VERSION" (CD, Japan) – music arrangement, production
Konami "Metal Gear Solid Bande Dessinee 2" (PSP, worldwide) – music
Konami "Metal Gear Music Collection" (CD, Japan) – music, production, orchestral recording (China)
Yuki Koyangi "Sunrise" (CD, Japan) – lyrics, music, production
Chihiro Yonekura "Lion's Song" (CD, Japan) – music
Properst (http://www.properst.co.jp) (web corporate promotion, Japan) – music
Marvelous Entertainment "Tokyo-Maj in Gakuen" (PS2, Japan) – sound design
Tohokushinsha Film Corporation "Scary Nursery Rhymes" (movie, Japan) – music
Konami "Pachi-Slot Beatmania" (Arcade, Japan) – music
10tacle "Boulder Dash" (DS, Europe) – music, sound design

2006
Konami "Metal Gear Solid Portable Ops" (PSP, worldwide) – music
SEGA "Yakuza 2" (PS2, worldwide) – music
Spike "Elvandia Story" (PS2, worldwide) – music
Konami "Rumble Roses XX" (Xbox 360, worldwide) – music
Gonzo "ROBO ROCK" (anime, Japan) – music
Capcom "Monster Hunter 3rd Anniversary Soundtrack (CD, Japan) – main theme remix
Konami "Yu-Gi-Oh Online" (Xbox 360, USA/Europe) – music
Konami "Thrill Drive 4" (arcade, worldwide) – music

References

External links
GEM Impact Website
Interview with Original Sound Version
Comprehensive Composer Profile at Square Enix Music Online

Video game composers